Ministry of Communication was a department dealing with telecommunications in Poland (telephones, post, telegraph). Liquidated in 2001, its competences were taken over by the Ministry of Infrastructure.

Ministers of Communications

Department of Communications, Post and Telegraph

 from 23 July 1944 to 4 November: Jan Michał Grubecki (SL)
 from 4 November 1944 to 31 December 1944: Jan Rabanowski (SD)

Ministry of Communications
 from 11 March 1955 to 13 June 1956: Wacław Szymanowski (ZSL)
 from 13 June 1956 to 25 February 1958: Jan Rabanowski (SD)
 from 25 February 1958 to 27 June 1969: Zygmunt Moscow (SD)
 from 28 June 1969 to 2 April 1980: Edward Kowalczyk (SD)
 from 3 April 1980 to 12 June 1981: Zbigniew Rudnicki (SD)
 from 12 June 1981 to 23 October 1987: Władysław Majewski (SD)

Ministry of Transport, Navigation and Communications

 from 23 October 1987 to 1 August 1989: Janusz Kamiński (PZPR)
 from September 12, 1989 to December 20, 1989: Franciszek Wielądek (PZPR)

Ministry of Communications
 from 20 December 1989 to 14 September 1990: Marek Kucharski (SD)
 from 14 September 1990 to 5 December 1991: Jerzy Slezak (SD)
 from 23 December 1991 to 11 July 1992: Marek Rusin
 from 11 July 1992 to 26 October 1993: Krzysztof Kilian (KLD)
 from 26 October 1993 to 17 October 1997: Andrzej Zieliński (PSL)
 from 31 October 1997 to 26 March 1999: Marek Zdrojewski (AWS, since 1998 ZChN)
 from 26 March 1999 to 16 March 2000: Maciej Srebro (AWS, ZChN)
 from 16 March 2000 to 18 July 2001: Tomasz Szyszko (AWS, ZChN/Right Alliance)
 from 18 July 2001 to 24 July 2001: Janusz Steinhoff (acting, PPChD)

External links
 Official government website of Poland

1955
1955
Poland,1955
1955 establishments in Poland